Derrynacrannog Glebe is a townland of 1,051  acres in County Fermanagh, Northern Ireland. It is situated in the civil parish of Belleek and the historic barony of Lurg.

See also
List of townlands in County Fermanagh

References 

Townlands of County Fermanagh
Civil parish of Belleek